Intercollegiate Knights (IK) was a collegiate men's honorary service group founded in 1922. These chapters were oriented toward service to their campus.

History
The predecessor organization of Intercollegiate Knights was Knights of the Hook at University of Washington. Knights of the Hook was formed in 1919 to serve the university and promote its traditions. The name was chosen due to group perceiving similarities between their duties and those of "the knighthood of old".

In 1922, the group was incorporated in the state of Washington, and Red and White were chosen as its colors. During the next two years, IK expanded to five other schools: University of Montana, Montana State, Washington State University, University of Idaho and University of Oregon. The first national convention was in 1924 at Washington State University. Over 20 chapters were chartered by the beginning of World War II mostly in the Northwestern United States however during the war, only a few chapters continued to operate. In 1959 there were 35 active chapters, but by 1978, there were only 16. By 1990, the organization splintered with the few remaining chapters each going their own way.

Symbols
Colors: The original colors were red and white. By 1947, those colors were Flame Red and Royal Blue.

Chapters
School List of Intercollegiate Knight Chapters
1922 University of Washington - Hook
1922 University of Idaho, Moscow - Ball and Chain
1922 Montana State University, Bozeman - Fang 
1922 Washington State University, Pullman - Cougar Guard
1922 University of Montana, Missoula - Bear Paw
1922 University of Oregon - Oregon Knights
1923 Oregon State University - Beaver Knights/Thane 
1924 Utah State University - Beno
1925 University of Redlands - Yeoman
1932 Lewis–Clark State College (Idaho)  - Pioneer Lancer
1932 Idaho State University - Tiger
1935 College of Idaho - Arrowrock
1935 Eastern Washington University - Tomahawk 
1936 Gonzaga University - Kennel
1937 Central Washington University - Claw
1937 Montana School of Mines, Butte - Copper Guard
1937 University of Utah - Scalper
1939 Linfield University - Old Oak
1940 Albion State Normal School - Cardinal
1940 Boise State University  - Golden Plume
1940 Seattle University - Wigwam
1941 Brigham Young University - Golden "Y"/Gold "Y"
1946 University of Puget Sound - Log
1947 Pacific University - Badger
1948 Whitworth University - Lookout
1948 Brigham Young University–Idaho (formerly Ricks College)  - Norseman Knights/Silver Chalice/Viking
1948 University of Portland - Pilots
1949 Lewis & Clark College (Oregon) - Mustang
1949 Branch Agricultural College (now Southern Utah U)- Rainbow Chapter
1949 Rocky Mountain College - Rimrock
1949 Humboldt State University - Humboldt Knights/Yurok
1950 Montana State University Billings - Stinger /Avalon
1951 University of Denver - Civic Center - Gold Nugget
1951 Westminster College (Utah)  -Los Caballeros 
1951 Eastern Oregon University -Mountaineer (Knights)
1951 University of Denver - Park Campus - Pioneer
1953 Olympic College - Cruiser
1953 Grays Harbor College - Harbor Knights
1953 Highlands University - Los Matadores
1953 Colorado State University - Totem
1953 Saint Martin's University - Yeoman
1954 Eastern Oklahoma A&M - Excalibur
1959 Pan American University - Camelot
1959 Carbon College - Golden Eagle
1959 Snow College - White Knights
1960 Portland State University - Odin's Raiders
1960 Northeastern Oklahoma A&M College - Praetor
1960 Nevada, Southern Division (now UNLV) - Red Eagle
1960 Western Oregon University - Wolf Knight
1961 Connors State College - Lancelot
1961 Oklahoma State University - Galahad
1961 Ventura College - Buena Ventura
1961 University of San Diego - Scout
1962 Fort Lewis A&M - Royal Windsor
1962 Church College of Hawaii - Kamehameha 
1962 University of Denver - Thor (October 1962 Gold Nugget and Pioneer chapters merged)
1963 Washburn University - Harbinger
1963 University of Missouri - Rolla - Osage
1964 Pacific Lutheran University
1964 Yakima Valley College - Golden Fleece
1968 Western Montana College - Crimson Tide
1969 Columbia Basin College - Falcon
1976 University of Texas - Don Quixote
1988 University of Missouri (Columbia) - Tri-Star
1990 Utah Valley State College - Silver Plume

References

Honor societies
Service organizations based in the United States
Defunct fraternities and sororities
Student organizations established in 1922
1922 establishments in Washington (state)